Abdessamad "Abde" Ezzalzouli (born 17 December 2001), sometimes known as Ez Abde, is a Moroccan professional footballer who plays as a winger for La Liga club Osasuna, on loan from Barcelona. Born in Morocco and raised in Spain, he plays the Morocco national team at international level. He began his professional career playing for Hércules.

Early life 
Born in Morocco, Ezzalzouli moved to Spain with his family at the age of seven to live and started his football youth career in the neighborhood of Carrús, in the city of Elche.

Club career

Early career 
Ezzalzouli was part of the youth academies for Peña Ilicitana Raval CF, CD Pablo Iglesias, Kelme CF, Promesas Elche CF, and CD Cultural Carrús. He trialled at Elche CF, the main club in his hometown, but was not offered a place in their academy.

Ezzalzouli continued to play for neighbourhood clubs in Elche until Hércules B coach Antonio Moreno Domínguez offered him a contract, and Ezzalzouli subsequently joined the main club in the neighbouring city of Alicante. He moved to Hércules' reserves in 2016, where he began his senior career in 2019.

Barcelona 
Ezzalzouli transferred to Barcelona B on 31 August 2021. He made his professional debut with Barcelona in a 1–1 La Liga draw with Alavés on 30 October 2021, coming on as a substitute in the 80th minute. Ezzalzouli thus became the first Moroccan-born player to feature for Barça's first team. He scored his first goal for Barcelona against Osasuna in a 2–2 draw.

Osasuna 

In September 2022, he renewed his contract with Barcelona until 2026 and was ensuingly loaned to Osasuna. On 4 September, he made his first appearance for Osasuna against Rayo Vallecano after being subbed in the 81st minute, he managed to assist the winning goal in that game, which ended in a 2–1 victory. 

On 26 January 2023, Ezzalzouli scored his first goal for the club in a 2-1 victory against Sevilla FC in the 2022–23 Copa del Rey Quarter-final. He as well scored his first League goal in a 3-2 win against Sevilla FC.

International career 
Ezzalzouli represented the Morocco under-20 team at the 2020 Arab Cup U-20, scoring two goals in five games. On 20 December 2021, Abdessamad rejected Vahid Halilhodžić invitation to represent Morocco national team in the 2021 Africa Cup of Nations to focus on his club.

On 17 March 2022, Ezzalzouli was listed in the 26-man squad to face DR Congo in the 2022 FIFA World Cup qualification – CAF Third Round.

In September 2022, Ezzalzouli was called up to join the Morocco national team. He played his first match in a friendly against Chile at the RCDE Stadium in Cornellà de Llobregat, which ended in a 2–0 victory.

On 10 November 2022, he was named in Morocco's 26-man squad for the 2022 FIFA World Cup in Qatar.

Career statistics

Club

Honours

Orders
Order of the Throne: 2022

References

External links 
 
 
 
 Profile at FC Barcelona

2001 births
Living people
People from Béni Mellal-Khénifra
Footballers from Elche
Moroccan footballers
Morocco international footballers
Morocco under-20 international footballers
Morocco youth international footballers
Association football wingers
FC Barcelona Atlètic players
FC Barcelona players
Hércules CF players
Hércules CF B players
CA Osasuna players
La Liga players
Primera Federación players
Tercera Federación players
2022 FIFA World Cup players
Moroccan expatriate footballers
Moroccan expatriate sportspeople in Spain
Expatriate footballers in Spain